Il Gazzettino is an Italian daily local newspaper, based in Mestre, Italy. It is the main newspaper in the Northeast Italy and is one of the oldest newspapers in Italy.

Profile
Il Gazzettino has the following eight local editions:
Venice
Treviso
Padua
Belluno
Rovigo
Vicenza-Bassano
Friuli (Udine)
Pordenone

In 2006 the Rome-based publishing company Caltagirone Editore acquired the majority stake of Il Gazzettino'''s publishing company, Società Editrice Padana (which also owns TeleFriuli).

The circulation of Il Gazzettino'' was 136,092 copies in 1997. It was 109,594 copies in 2004. The paper had a circulation of 86,996 copies in 2008.

References

External links
 Official Website 

1887 establishments in Italy
Gazzettino
Mass media in Venice
Daily newspapers published in Italy
Gazzettino
Italian news websites